Somafone Telecommunications Service Company (operating as Somafone) is one of Somalia's leading telecommunications firms. It was established in 2003 as a fully owned subsidiary of Somafone FZ LLC of the Dubai Internet City. The company's head offices are located in Mogadishu.

See also
Golis Telecom Somalia
Hormuud Telecom
Telcom
Netco (Somalia)
NationLink Telecom
Somali Telecom Group

External links
Somafone.com official site

Telecommunications companies of Somalia
Companies based in Mogadishu
2003 establishments in Somalia